José Mário dos Santos Mourinho Félix GOIH (born 26 January 1963), is a Portuguese professional football manager and former player who is the current head coach of Italian Serie A club Roma. Once dubbed "The Special One" by the British media, Mourinho is one of the most decorated managers ever and is widely considered to be among the greatest managers of all time.

After an uneventful career as a midfielder in the Portuguese leagues, Mourinho moved into coaching, first as an interpreter for Sir Bobby Robson at Sporting CP and Porto, before gaining success as an assistant at Barcelona under both Robson and his successor, Louis van Gaal. After impressing with brief stints at Benfica and União de Leiria, Mourinho returned to Porto as manager in 2002, winning the Primeira Liga twice, a Taça de Portugal, the UEFA Cup and the UEFA Champions League, Porto's first European Cup title since 1987. That success earned him a move to England with Chelsea in 2004. Marked by his braggadocio during his early managerial career, Mourinho famously said "I think I'm a special one", which came to be a renowned moniker for him. With the club, he won two Premier League titles, an FA Cup and two League Cups in his three seasons at the club, before he departed in 2007 amid reports of disagreements with club owner Roman Abramovich.

In 2008, Mourinho joined Italian club Inter Milan, where he won Serie A twice, including a European treble of Serie A, the Coppa Italia and the UEFA Champions League in 2010, a first for an Italian club. This made him one of five coaches to have won the European Cup with two clubs, and later that year, earned him the first FIFA World Coach of the Year. Mourinho then moved to Real Madrid in Spain, where he won La Liga in 2011–12 with a record points tally, becoming the fifth coach to have won league titles in four countries. He also won a Copa del Rey and a Supercopa de España.

Mourinho left Real Madrid in 2013 and rejoined Chelsea, where he won another league title and League Cup, but was dismissed in 2015 after a poor run of results. Remaining in England, he was appointed at Manchester United and Tottenham Hotspur respectively, but his tenure at both clubs were relatively short-lived and ended in acrimonious fashion. Despite this, he won the UEFA Europa League, League Cup and FA Community Shield in his first season with Manchester United, and led Tottenham to the final of the League Cup. He was soon hired by Roma, leading them to win the inaugural UEFA Europa Conference League — this made him the first manager to both reach and win the final of a major European competition with four different clubs, the third manager to have won all three major European club competitions and the first to achieve the UEFA treble by winning the Champions League, UEFA Cup/Europa League and Europa Conference League.

He was named Portuguese Coach of the Century by the Portuguese Football Federation (FPF) in 2015, and was the first coach to spend more than £1 billion on transfers. Due to his tactical knowledge, charismatic and controversial personality, and a reputation for prioritising results over attractive football, he has drawn comparisons, by both admirers and critics, with Argentine manager Helenio Herrera.

Early life, playing career and education
Mourinho was born in 1963 to a large middle-class family in Setúbal (a suburb of the Lisbon metropolitan area), Portugal, the son of José Manuel Mourinho Félix, who was known by the name Félix Mourinho, and his wife, Maria Júlia Carrajola dos Santos. His father played football professionally for Belenenses and Vitória de Setúbal, earning one cap for Portugal in the course of his career. His mother was a primary school teacher from an affluent background; her uncle funded the construction of the Vitória de Setúbal football stadium. The Carnation Revolution leading to the fall of António de Oliveira Salazar's Estado Novo regime in April 1974 also led to the family losing all but a single property in nearby Palmela.

Mourinho wanted to follow in his father's footsteps and joined the Belenenses youth team. Graduating to the senior level, he left the club in 1980 to sign for Rio Ave, where he played for the reserve team, and in 1981, was joined by his father, who was named first team manager. There, he struck up a prolific partnership with veteran striker Mário Reis. According to former teammate Baltemar Brito (who would become an assistant to Mourinho early on his managerial career), the duo scored around 100 goals, with Mourinho netting forty-seven times. In addition to playing for the reserves, Mourinho was usually tasked with scouting other teams for his father. He was rarely selected by his father, but he made his debut for the club in the third round of the Taça de Portugal, in a 2–1 extra time win over Salgueiros. On the final day of the campaign against champions-elect Sporting CP, a defender was injured in the pre-match warm up, so he was told to get changed. Club president José Maria Pinho, fearing the threat of nepotism, overruled the decision to do so; the incident saw the pair leave to join Belenenses in the summer. Mourinho mostly spent the season playing for the reserve team, and he played for the first team in the second round of the Taça de Portugal against Vila Franca do Campo. With Belenenses 8–0 up at half-time, Mourinho came on as a second-half substitute and scored a hat-trick as the team won 17–0, which remains the club's biggest ever victory in the tournament. When his father returned to Rio Ave, Mourinho did not go with him and continued to play in the lower levels of the Portuguese football league system, first with Sesimbra, and then for Comércio e Indústria, where he finished his career. At the latter club, he was captain of the team and would save the life of a teammate who had gotten trapped in a car that had caught on fire. Mourinho decided that he lacked the requisite pace and power to become a professional and chose to focus on becoming a football coach instead.

His mother enrolled him in a business school, but Mourinho dropped out on his first day, deciding he would rather focus on sport, and chose to attend the Instituto Superior de Educação Física (ISEF), Technical University of Lisbon, to study sports science. After attending coaching courses held by the English and Scottish Football Associations, former Scotland manager Andy Roxburgh took note of the young Portuguese's drive and attention to detail. Mourinho sought to redefine the role of coach in football by mixing coaching theory with motivational and psychological techniques.

Coaching career
After leaving his job as a school coach, Mourinho looked for a path into professional management in his hometown and became youth team coach at Vitória de Setúbal in the early 1990s. Later he accepted the position of assistant manager at Estrela da Amadora, then was a scout at Ovarense. Then, in 1992, an opportunity arose to work as a translator for a top foreign coach: Bobby Robson had been appointed as the new manager of Lisbon club Sporting CP and needed an English-speaking local coach to work as his interpreter. His presentation was on 7 July, alongside president Sousa Cintra, manager Robson and Manuel Fernandes.

Mourinho began discussing tactics and coaching with Robson in his interpreting role. Robson was sacked by the club in December 1993. When Porto appointed him as their head coach, Mourinho moved with him, continuing to coach and interpret for players at the new club. The Porto team, consisting of players like Ljubinko Drulović, Domingos, Rui Barros, Jorge Costa and Vítor Baía, went on to dominate Portuguese football the following years. With Robson as head coach and Mourinho as his assistant, Porto reached the 1993–94 UEFA Champions League semi-finals and won the 1993–94 Taça de Portugal, the 1994–95 and 1995–96 Portuguese championship, and the 1994, 1995 and 1996 Portuguese Super Cup, the latter with a 5–0 victory over arch-rivals Benfica, in what proved to be Robson's last game at Porto before moving to Barcelona, earning Robson the nickname "Bobby Five-O" in Portugal.

After two years at Porto, the duo moved again, joining Barcelona in 1996. Mourinho and his family moved to the city of Barcelona, and he gradually became a prominent figure of the club's staff by translating at press conferences, planning practice sessions and helping players through tactical advice and analyses of the opposition. Robson and Mourinho's styles complemented each other: the Englishman favoured an attacking style, while Mourinho covered defensive options, and the Portuguese's love of planning and training combined with Robson's direct man-management. The Barcelona attack was led by a prime Ronaldo – whom Mourinho regards as the best player post-Diego Maradona. The partnership was fruitful and Barcelona finished the season by winning the European Cup Winners' Cup, the Copa del Rey and Supercopa de España. Robson moved clubs the following season but this time Mourinho did not follow as Barcelona were keen to retain him as assistant manager. The two remained good friends and Mourinho later reflected on the effect Robson had had upon him:

He began working with Robson's successor, Louis van Gaal, and he learned much from the Dutchman's conscientious style. Both assistant and head coach combined their studious approach to the game and Barcelona won La Liga twice in Van Gaal's first two years as coach. Van Gaal saw that his number two had the promise to be more than a skilled assistant. He let Mourinho develop his own independent coaching style and entrusted him with the coaching duties of Barcelona B. Van Gaal also let Mourinho take charge of the first team (acting as Mourinho's assistant himself) for certain trophies, like the Copa Catalunya, which Mourinho won in 2000.

Managerial career

Benfica
The chance to become a top-tier manager arrived in September 2000 when Mourinho moved up from his role as assistant manager at Benfica to replace manager Jupp Heynckes after the fourth week of the Primeira Liga. The Benfica hierarchy wanted to appoint Jesualdo Ferreira as the new assistant coach, but Mourinho refused and picked Carlos Mozer, a retired Benfica defender, as his right-hand man instead.

Mourinho was highly critical of Ferreira, whom he had first encountered as his teacher at ISEF and later lambasted the veteran coach by stating, "This could be the story of a donkey who worked for 30 years but never became a horse." Only weeks after being given the job at Benfica, Mourinho's mentor, Sir Bobby Robson, offered him the assistant manager's role at Newcastle United. Such was Robson's desperation for Mourinho to join him he offered to step down after two years in charge and hand over the reins to Mourinho. Mourinho turned the offer down and said he knew Robson would never step down at the club he loved.

Mourinho and Mozer proved a popular combination, enjoying a 3–0 win against rivals Sporting CP in December. Their reign appeared to be at risk after Benfica's election turned against club president João Vale e Azevedo and the newly elected Manuel Vilarinho said that he would instate ex-Benfica player Toni as his new coach. Although Vilarinho had no intention of firing him immediately, Mourinho used the victory over Sporting to test the president's loyalty and he asked for a contract extension. Vilarinho refused the demand and Mourinho resigned from his position immediately. He left the club on 5 December 2000 after just nine league games in charge. Upon later reflection, Vilarinho rued his poor judgement and expressed his frustration at losing Mourinho:

União de Leiria
Mourinho found a new managerial post in July 2001 with União de Leiria. During his time at União de Leiria, the team was on a run contesting places as high as third and fourth. After a 1–1 draw against Santa Clara on 20 January 2002, Mourinho recorded eight matches unbeaten in the league (six wins, two draws) since 25 November 2001. And the team was in fourth place, one point ahead of Porto, one point behind of Benfica and six points behind the top of the league table. Mourinho's successes at Leiria did not go unrecognised and he caught the attention of larger Portuguese clubs.

Porto
Mourinho was then hand-picked by Porto to replace Octávio Machado on 23 January 2002. At this time, Porto was in fifth place in the Liga (behind Sporting CP, Boavista, União de Leiria and Benfica), had been eliminated from the Taça de Portugal and was in last place in their UEFA Champions League second group stage. Mourinho guided the team to third place that year after a strong 15-game run (including 11 wins) and gave the promise of "making Porto champions next year".

He quickly identified several key players whom he saw as the backbone of what he believed would be a perfect Porto team: Vítor Baía, Ricardo Carvalho, Costinha, Deco, Dmitri Alenichev and Hélder Postiga. He recalled captain Jorge Costa after a six-month loan to Charlton Athletic. The signings from other clubs included Nuno Valente and Derlei from União de Leiria; Paulo Ferreira from Vitória de Setúbal; Pedro Emanuel from Boavista; and Edgaras Jankauskas and Maniche, who both had been out of contract at Benfica.

2002–03 season
During the pre-season, Mourinho put detailed reports of the team training on the club website. The reports were filled with formal vocabulary, as, for instance, he referred to a  jog as an extended aerobic exercise. One of the key aspects in Mourinho-era Porto was the pressuring play, which started at the offensive line, dubbed "pressão alta" ("high pressure"). The physical and combative abilities of the teams' defenders and midfielders allowed Porto to apply pressure from the offensive lines and forced opponents either to concede the ball or try longer, uncertain passes.

In 2003, Mourinho won his first Primeira Liga with a 27–5–2 record, 11 points clear of Benfica, the team he quit two years earlier. The total of 86 points out of the possible maximum of 102 was a Portuguese record, until the 2015–16 season won by Benfica (88 points), since the rule of three points per win was introduced. Mourinho also won the Taça de Portugal, beating former club Leiria in the final, and the UEFA Cup final against Celtic, both in May 2003.

2003–04 season
The following season witnessed further successes: he led Porto to victory in the one-match Portuguese Super Cup, beating Leiria 1–0. They lost the UEFA Super Cup 1–0 to Milan, with Andriy Shevchenko scoring the solitary goal. The team was dominant in the Primeira Liga and finished the season with a perfect home record, an eight-point advantage and a 27-match unbeaten run that ran from the start of the season until early April, when they lost to Gil Vicente; they secured the title five weeks before the end of the season. Porto lost the 2004 Taça de Portugal Final to Benfica in May 2004, but two weeks later, Mourinho won a greater prize: the UEFA Champions League, with a 3–0 win over Monaco in Germany. The club had eliminated Manchester United, Lyon and Deportivo de La Coruña and their sole defeat of the competition came against Real Madrid in the group round.

In the first leg between Manchester United and Porto, United manager Sir Alex Ferguson confronted Mourinho after Roy Keane received a red card for stamping on Vítor Baía. In the second leg at Old Trafford, Porto were on the verge of an away-goals defeat when Costinha scored a goal in the 89th minute to win the tie. Mourinho flamboyantly celebrated the goal by leaving his dugout, fists punching the air as he sprinted down the sideline near to his celebrating players – this dramatic celebration is regarded as the moment when Mourinho announced himself to the game. Mourinho's Porto win over Ferguson's United was a preview of his move to the Premier League managing Chelsea, where the two men would enjoy a competitive but respectful relationship. In 2005, after Chelsea clinched the Premier League title, Ferguson had his players form a guard of honour at Chelsea's next game at Old Trafford, a favour that Mourinho returned in 2007 at Stamford Bridge after Ferguson's squad were confirmed league champions.

Liverpool offered their managerial position to Rafael Benítez and Mourinho instead accepted a large offer from Roman Abramovich and pledged his immediate future to Chelsea.

Chelsea
On 2 June 2004, Mourinho moved to Chelsea on a three-year contract, after a £1.7 million compensation package was agreed with Porto, making him the first Portuguese manager in the Premier League. In a press conference upon joining the English side, Mourinho spoke on Chelsea's credentials, stating, "We have top players and, sorry if I'm arrogant, we have a top manager", before adding,

This comment resulted in the media dubbing him "The Special One", and his braggadocio was widely recognised during his early managerial career. Mourinho recruited his backroom staff from Porto, consisting of assistant manager Baltemar Brito, fitness coach Rui Faria, chief scout André Villas-Boas and goalkeeping coach Silvino Louro. He retained Steve Clarke, a long-serving former player at Chelsea, who had also performed an assistant managerial-type role under previous managers at the club. In terms of spending, Mourinho carried on where his predecessor Claudio Ranieri left off, as, bankrolled by Roman Abramovich, he spent in excess of £70 million in transfer fees on players such as Tiago (£10 million) from Benfica, Michael Essien (£24.4 million) from Lyon, Didier Drogba (£24 million) from Marseille, Mateja Kežman (£5.4 million) from PSV, and Porto pair Ricardo Carvalho (£19.8 million) and Paulo Ferreira (£13.3 million).

2004–05 season
Under Mourinho, Chelsea built on the potential developed in the previous season. By early December, they were at the top of the Premier League table and had reached the knock-out stages of the Champions League. He secured his first trophy by winning the League Cup against Liverpool 3–2 (AET) in Cardiff. Towards the end of the match, Mourinho was escorted from the touchline after putting his finger to his mouth in the direction of Liverpool fans, as a response to taunts directed towards him whilst Liverpool were leading, before the equalising goal.

Chelsea met Barcelona in the Champions League round of 16, a highly contested match where the Blues lost away in the first leg 2–1 but advanced on aggregate, winning at home 4–2. In the quarter-finals against Bayern Munich, Mourinho who was banned from attending the stadium, waited in the dressing room before the match to talk to his players, then he hid in a laundry basket to leave the stadium. Later on, he missed the chance of back-to-back Champions League successes when Chelsea were knocked out of the competition by a controversial goal in the semi-finals by eventual winners Liverpool. Under Mourinho, Chelsea secured their first top-flight domestic title in 50 years, setting a string of English football records in the process, including the most points ever achieved in the Premier League (95) and the fewest goals conceded (15).

2005–06 season
Chelsea started the next season well: they defeated Arsenal 2–1 to win the 2005 FA Community Shield and topped the Premier League from the first weekend of the 2005–06 season. Chelsea beat rivals Manchester United 3–0 to win their second consecutive Premier League title and Mourinho's fourth domestic title in a row. After the presentation of his championship medal, Mourinho threw his medal and blazer into the crowd. He was awarded a second medal within minutes, which he also threw into the crowd.

2006–07 season
The 2006–07 season saw growing media speculation that Mourinho would leave the club at the season's conclusion due to alleged poor relations with owner Roman Abramovich and a power struggle with sporting director Frank Arnesen and Abramovich advisor Piet de Visser. Mourinho later cleared doubts regarding his future at Stamford Bridge, stating that there would only be two ways for him to leave Chelsea: if Chelsea did not offer him a new contract before the expiry of his current deal in June 2010, or if Chelsea were to sack him.

Didier Drogba had the highest scoring season of his career that year and this led to his newly signed strike partner Andrey Shevchenko to be dropped from the starting line-up towards the end of the season by Mourinho. Notably, in the Champions League semi-final match against Liverpool at Anfield, Shevchenko was not even included on the bench. The other high-profile arrival besides Shevchenko was German captain Michael Ballack, a free agent from Bayern Munich who was signed to strengthen the midfield. The Icelandic striker Eiður Guðjohnsen departed the club for Barcelona.

Despite the unrest, Chelsea won the League Cup again by defeating Arsenal at the Millennium Stadium. The possibility of the quadruple was brought to an end on 1 May 2007 when Liverpool eliminated Chelsea from the Champions League on penalties at Anfield, following a 1–1 aggregate draw. Days later, Chelsea drew 1–1 with Arsenal at the Emirates Stadium, which secured the Premier League title for Manchester United. This was Mourinho's first season without a league title win in five years. Mourinho led Chelsea to a 1–0 victory against Manchester United in the 2007 FA Cup Final, winning in the first final to be played at the rebuilt Wembley Stadium. This was his first FA Cup win which meant that he had won every domestic trophy available to a Premier League manager.

There was to be further friction between Mourinho and Abramovich when Avram Grant was appointed as director of football, despite objections from Mourinho. Grant's position was further enhanced by being given a seat on the board. In spite of these tensions, the 2007–08 transfer season would see the departure of Dutch winger Arjen Robben to Real Madrid and the arrival of French midfielder Florent Malouda from Lyon.

2007–08 season
In the first match of the 2007–08 season, Chelsea beat Birmingham City 3–2 to set a new record of 64 consecutive home league matches without defeat. Despite surpassing the record set by Liverpool between 1978 and 1981, the start to the 2007–08 season was less successful than previous starts. The team lost at Aston Villa and followed this with a goalless draw at home to Blackburn Rovers. Their opening game in the UEFA Champions League saw them only manage a 1–1 home draw against the Norwegian team Rosenborg BK in front of only 24,973 (an almost half-empty stadium), which included an unimpressed owner Roman Abramovich.

Mourinho unexpectedly left Chelsea on 20 September 2007 "by mutual consent", although there had been a series of disagreements with owner Abramovich. The Chelsea board held an emergency meeting and decided it was time to part with their manager. Mourinho left as the most successful manager in Chelsea's history, having won six trophies for the club in three years. He was also undefeated in all home league games. Avram Grant succeeded Mourinho as Chelsea manager but failed to win any trophies in his year in charge and would be sacked at the end of the 2007–08 season. Grant's squad managed to reach the final of the Champions League (something Mourinho failed to achieve in his three years at Chelsea), reach the final of the League Cup and maintained the unbeaten home streak at Stamford Bridge. Grant's Chelsea also finished second in the Premier League.

Inter Milan
On 2 June 2008, Mourinho was appointed the successor of Roberto Mancini at Inter Milan on a three-year contract and brought along with him much of his backroom staff who had served him at both Chelsea and Porto. He chose Giuseppe Baresi, a former Inter player and ex-head coach of their youth academy, as his assistant. He spoke solely in Italian in his first press conference as Inter boss, claiming to have learnt it "in three weeks". Mourinho stated that he only intended to make a few major signings in the summer. By the end of the transfer window, he had brought three new players to the side: Brazilian winger Mancini (€13 million), Ghanaian midfielder Sulley Muntari for a reported €14 million and Portuguese winger Ricardo Quaresma for a cash/player exchange fee of €18.6 million plus young Portuguese midfielder Pelé.

2008–09 season

In his first season as Inter head coach, Mourinho won the Supercoppa Italiana, beating Roma on penalties, and finished top of Serie A. Inter were eliminated 2–0 on aggregate by Manchester United in the first knock-out round of the Champions League, and he also failed to win the Coppa Italia, losing 3–1 on aggregate to Sampdoria in the semi-finals. As UEFA was beginning to push the larger clubs in top leagues to play more homegrown players, Mourinho regularly played 18-year-old Italian forward Mario Balotelli and promoted academy defender Davide Santon to the first team permanently, installing an Italian contingent into a team previously composed of mostly foreign players. Both teenagers played a part in the Scudetto-winning season and played enough games to earn their first senior trophy.

Despite his domestic successes in winning the Scudetto by a 10-point margin, Mourinho's first season in Italy was viewed as disappointing by some Inter fans, as the club failed to improve on the performances of his predecessor Roberto Mancini in the Champions League. Inter put in a series of lacklustre group stage performances that included a shock 1–0 home loss to Panathinaikos and an away draw with Cypriot minnows Anorthosis Famagusta. Inter qualified for the knockout stages of the Champions League but failed to make it to the quarter-finals after being defeated by Manchester United.

On 16 May 2009, Inter mathematically won the Serie A title after runners-up Milan lost to Udinese. This loss left the Nerazzurri seven points above their crosstown rivals with only two games remaining. They would eventually finish 10 points clear of Milan.

2009–10 season

On 28 July 2009, Mourinho was reported to have shown interest in taking over at Manchester United when Alex Ferguson retired. He was quoted as saying, "I would consider going to Manchester United but United have to consider if they want me to succeed Sir Alex Ferguson. If they do, then of course."

Adriano left Inter in April 2009, and the exit of the Brazilian striker was followed by the Argentine duo Julio Cruz and Hernán Crespo. Legendary Portuguese attacking midfielder and veteran Luís Figo retired. Figo was on the verge of leaving Inter under Mancini due to a lack of playing time, but in his final season Mourinho used him frequently. Mourinho signed Argentine striker Diego Milito, who fell just one goal short of winning the top scorer award with Genoa, as well as Thiago Motta and Wesley Sneijder, to bolster the midfield. Perhaps his most notable signing of the summer of his second season was a swap deal of Zlatan Ibrahimović in exchange for Barcelona's Cameroonian striker Samuel Eto'o and a reported £35 million. This transfer was the second most expensive in the history of the transfer market, after Cristiano Ronaldo moved from Manchester United to Real Madrid earlier in the summer. Eto'o got off to a promising start with Inter by scoring two goals in the first two matches of the season.

Ricardo Quaresma's signing from Mourinho's old club Porto was viewed as a missing link in the Inter squad, but his play disappointed the club and led him to be loaned out to Chelsea midway through the season, ironically Mourinho's other former club. Mancini also failed to dominate in the midfield and addressing these shortcomings in the transfer market became a priority for Inter. Inter's lack of a creative playmaker, or trequartista, had been blamed for the Champions League failure. In an attempt to deal with this issue, Inter signed Dutch midfielder Wesley Sneijder from Real Madrid.

Inter struggled in their first two matches of the new season. The team lost the Supercoppa to Lazio 2–1 and drew 1–1 with newly promoted Bari at the San Siro. Mourinho's team improved dramatically after that, as he built a formidable midfield with Sneijder at the heart of it and the likes of new signing Thiago Motta and veterans Javier Zanetti and Dejan Stanković. Inter went on to score more than 30 goals before the end of November, thrashing derby rivals Milan 4–0, with new signings Diego Milito and Motta both scoring, and hammering Genoa 5–0, the largest margin of victory in the Serie A that season. Mourinho was sent off in the December Derby d'Italia away fixture after he sarcastically applauded the referee for what he felt was a dubious free-kick given to Juventus and Inter went on to lose 2–1, courtesy of a Claudio Marchisio winner in the second half.

Mourinho achieved what was hailed as one of his career highlights after Inter managed to progress to the Champions League quarter-finals by defeating his former team Chelsea in both legs (2–1 win at San Siro, then followed by a 1–0 win at Stamford Bridge). His difficult relationship with young striker Mario Balotelli and the team's loss of form that led Inter to achieve only seven points in six games (with three of those games, including a shock 1–3 defeat at the hands of Sicilian minnows Catania, happening during Mourinho's ban) were heavily criticised by the media and pundits.

On 6 April 2010, Mourinho became the first manager in history to take three different teams to the semi-finals of the Champions League (this record was equalled by Bayern Munich manager Louis van Gaal a day later) after Inter managed to overcome CSKA Moscow 1–0 in Russia in the second leg of their quarter-final tie, which ended 2–0 on aggregate. Wesley Sneijder's goal in the sixth minute proved the difference in a match played in laid-back style. This marked the first time in seven years that Inter managed to make it to the semi-finals of the competition. On 13 April, Inter continued their good season, having managed to reach the Coppa Italia final, for the first time under Mourinho, by beating Fiorentina 1–0 away (2–0 on aggregate).

On 28 April 2010, José Mourinho reached the Champions League final for the second time in his career after Inter beat holders Barcelona 3–2 on aggregate, despite losing 1–0 at Camp Nou (which Mourinho called "the most beautiful defeat of my life"). This brought Inter back into a European Cup final 38 years after their last (a defeat by Ajax). Mourinho was involved in a brief scuffle with Barcelona goalkeeper Víctor Valdés while attempting to join in the Inter celebrations. Mourinho afterwards stated that "anti-Madridismo" had motivated the Barça fans, suggesting that they were obsessed with reaching the final and winning the tournament in their arch-rival's home ground. Marca proclaimed that Mourinho had passed the test to become the next head coach of Real Madrid, as their fans celebrated the elimination of Barcelona.

On 2 May, after a 2–0 away win at Rome against Lazio, Inter almost secured the Serie A title. On 5 May 2010, the team won the Coppa Italia, defeating Roma 1–0, and on 16 May 2010, Inter beat Siena 1–0 to secure the domestic double, accomplishing the feat of winning all trophies available for a manager in the Serie A. On 22 May 2010, Inter won the 2010 Champions League after beating Bayern Munich 2–0, and in doing so became the first Italian club to complete the treble, with Mourinho personally celebrating the second Champions League title in his managerial career.

The day after having won the Champions League, Mourinho said that he was "sad, as almost for sure it's my last game with Inter". He then added that "if you don't coach Real Madrid then you will always have a gap in your career". After days of discussions between Real Madrid and Inter, a world-record-breaking compensation package was successfully agreed on 28 May 2010, and Mourinho was consequently released by Inter.

Real Madrid
On 28 May 2010, it was confirmed that Mourinho would take over from Manuel Pellegrini at the Santiago Bernabéu Stadium. On 31 May 2010, Mourinho was unveiled as the new manager of Real Madrid after signing a four-year contract, and became the 11th manager at the club in the previous seven years. Mourinho was appointed sporting manager as well as first-team coach, and he was referred to as a Galáctico (a term more often used for star players instead of coaches).

Prior to Mourinho's arrival, Real Madrid had underperformed despite paying record transfer fees for Galácticos such as Kaká and Cristiano Ronaldo. Their 2009–10 season was marked by disappointments such as Alcorconazo, a shock 2009–10 Copa del Rey round of 32 defeat to Segunda División B team Alcorcón, and elimination from the Champions League by Lyon in the round of 16, though they finished second in La Liga with a club record 96 points. By the end of the transfer window, after the 2010 FIFA World Cup, Mourinho had brought four new players to the squad: the Germans Sami Khedira (€13 million) and Mesut Özil (€15 million), Portuguese defender Ricardo Carvalho (€8 million) and Argentine winger Ángel Di María (€25 million plus €11 million on incentives).

2010–11 season

On 29 August 2010, Real Madrid drew 0–0 at Mallorca in Mourinho's first La Liga game as manager. When asked about all the missed opportunities against Levante in La Liga and Auxerre in the Champions League, Mourinho said, "One day some poor rival is going to pay for the chances we've missed today." The following match at the Bernabéu ended with a 6–1 victory over Deportivo de La Coruña. The following league games confirmed Mourinho's statement, defeating Málaga 4–1 and Racing Santander 6–1.

On 29 November 2010, Mourinho's Madrid were defeated in his first Clásico encounter against Barcelona. The match, held in Camp Nou, ended 5–0 to the hosts, with Real Madrid director Florentino Pérez regarding it the worst game in the history of Real Madrid. Sporting director Jorge Valdano also criticised Mourinho for his "inability to bring a major correction to the game" and "not leaving his bench for the [majority] of the match". When asked by a media reporter, Mourinho refused to call the loss a humiliation.

On 30 November 2010, Mourinho was fined £33,500 for appearing to instruct Xabi Alonso and Sergio Ramos to attempt to receive a tactical second yellow card in the 4–0 Champions League win against Ajax. He was also banned for two Champions League matches, the second of which is suspended for three years. On 22 December 2010, Mourinho won a match by the widest margin in his career, winning 8–0 against Levante, also of La Liga, in the first leg of their quarter-final of the Copa del Rey.

On 20 April 2011, Mourinho won his first trophy in Spanish football as Real Madrid defeated arch-rivals Barcelona 1–0 in the Copa del Rey final held at the Mestalla Stadium in Valencia, ending Real Madrid's 18-year-long Copa del Rey drought. It was also Real's first trophy since their 2007–08 La Liga title. One week later, the two teams met again in the first leg of the semi-finals of the Champions League, Real Madrid's furthest progress in the tournament since the 2003 semi-finals, as the club was knocked out in the 2004 quarter-finals, and then from 2005 to 2010 the club had suffered six consecutive exits at the round of 16. At the Bernabéu, Real's Pepe was dismissed in the 61st minute and Mourinho was sent to the stands for protesting; afterward, Barça's Lionel Messi scored two late goals to take control of the tie. The second leg at Camp Nou finished 1–1, which eliminated Real from the tournament.

2011–12 season
On 7 December 2011, Real Madrid defeated Ajax with a 3–0 scoreline and concluded the Champions League group stage with six victories, becoming the fifth team in Champions League history to accomplish the feat. The victory was the team's 15th consecutive win to equal a club record set 50 years earlier, in 1961. On 21 April 2012, Real Madrid won 2–1 against Barcelona in El Clásico at Camp Nou, extending their lead in La Liga to seven points with four matches remaining. This was the first victory for Real Madrid in La Liga against their archrivals since 2008 and the first overall at Camp Nou since 2007. Also, in this match Real Madrid broke the record for most goals scored in the championship, with 109. Barça manager Pep Guardiola conceded the title to Real Madrid.

Mourinho's side advanced to the semi-finals of the Champions League for the second consecutive year. The first leg away finished with a 2–1 win to Bayern Munich. In the second leg at home, Real Madrid took a 2–0 lead from two Cristiano Ronaldo goals but Bayern's Arjen Robben (a former Real player whom Mourinho previously managed at Chelsea) converted a penalty to level the aggregate score at 3–3, and Madrid was eliminated in the shootout with Ronaldo, Kaká and Ramos all failing to convert their spot kicks. Bayern manager Jupp Heynckes said that Mourinho "came to the dressing room to congratulate my players and coaching staff after the game. It was very noble".

On 2 May 2012, Real Madrid won 3–0 against Athletic Bilbao to clinch the Liga title for the first time in four years. On 13 May 2012, Real Madrid defeated Mallorca 4–1 in their last league match of the season, which set records for most games won in a La Liga season (32), most away wins (16), most points obtained in any of the top European leagues (100), improving the most goals scored record they already had set earlier (121) and finishing the season with the highest goal difference (+89). Real Madrid topped the league nine points clear of runners-up Barcelona.

2012–13 season

On 22 May 2012, Mourinho signed a new four-year contract to remain as Real Madrid manager through to 2016. After losing 3–2 in Barcelona in the first leg of the 2012 Supercopa de España, Real Madrid won the return leg in Madrid 2–1. Real Madrid won the competition on the away goals rule after a tie of 4–4 on aggregate. This meant Mourinho had won every domestic title available for a manager in the Spanish top division within two years. He became the only coach who has won the national super cups in four European countries. This also made Mourinho the first manager in history to win every domestic title, the league championship, cup, super cup and league cup (if available) in four European leagues.

Real Madrid reached the semi-finals of the Champions League for the third consecutive year under Mourinho's management. The club was defeated 4–1 in the first leg away at Borussia Dortmund. In the second leg at home, Real managed to score two goals in the last 10 minutes, but the team could not get the third goal that would have levelled the aggregate score and sent them through on away goals.

In the post-game press conference after the second leg with Dortmund, Mourinho hinted that the 2012–13 season with Real Madrid would be his last, saying, "I am loved by some clubs, especially one. In Spain it is different, some people hate me, many of you in this [press] room." Mourinho's fraught relationships with Sergio Ramos and club captain Iker Casillas (a popular player whom Mourinho sidelined in 2013) caused divisions between fans in the "Mourinhistas" and "Madridistas" (the more traditional Real Madrid fans) camps. His relationship with Cristiano Ronaldo became difficult because, according to Mourinho, the player "maybe thinks that he knows everything and that the coach cannot improve him anymore", so was unwilling to accept constructive criticism. Mourinho was also criticised for controversial incidents, including poking Tito Vilanova (then assistant coach at Barcelona) in the eye during a brawl, continual complaints about refereeing bias, clashes with journalists and Real officials, and frequent hints that Barça received favourable treatment from UEFA.

Following the 2013 Copa del Rey final loss to Atlético Madrid on 17 May, Mourinho called the 2012–13 season "the worst of my career". Three days later, Real Madrid president Florentino Pérez announced Mourinho would leave the club at the end of the season by "mutual agreement", a year after signing a contract extension to 2016.

Return to Chelsea

On 3 June 2013, Chelsea appointed Mourinho as manager for the second time, on a four-year contract. Mourinho told Chelsea TV, "In my career I've had two great passions – Inter and Chelsea – and Chelsea is more than important for me." "It was very, very hard to play against Chelsea, and I did it only twice which was not so bad." "Now I promise exactly the same things I promised in 2004 with this difference to add: I'm one of you." On 10 June 2013, Mourinho was officially confirmed as Chelsea manager for the second time at a press conference held at Stamford Bridge.

2013–14 season
Mourinho's first competitive game back in charge of Chelsea ended in a 2–0 home victory against Hull City on 18 August 2013. On 30 August Mourinho faced defending UEFA Champions League winners Bayern Munich in the UEFA Super Cup, which was his second as a manager. Despite taking the lead Chelsea lost to Bayern on penalties as Romelu Lukaku saw his decisive penalty getting saved by Bayern keeper Manuel Neuer. Following the loss to Pep Guardiola's Bayern Munich he said, "They take the cup and the best team lost. Even with ten men we played fantastically. Pride is OK but we lost."

On 29 January 2014, following a 0–0 draw at home to West Ham United, Mourinho described the Hammers as playing "19th century football", saying, "This is not the best league in the world, this is football from the 19th century," and, "The only [other] thing I could bring was a Black and Decker to destroy the wall." In March, recognizing his contributions to the club, Mourinho was given share number 1 by the Chelsea Pitch Owners Association which owns the Stamford Bridge freehold.

On 19 April 2014, Mourinho suffered his first ever home league defeat as Chelsea manager in a 2–1 loss to Sunderland at Stamford Bridge. He consistently played down Chelsea's title chances throughout the season and referred to it as a transitional season, slowly moulding his squad and most significantly dropping (and eventually selling) Chelsea's player of the year of the two previous seasons, Juan Mata. Chelsea went on to finish third in the 2013–14 Premier League, four points behind champions Manchester City, and was eliminated in the semi-finals of the 2013–14 Champions League by Atlético Madrid.

2014–15 season

Chelsea started their 2014–15 Premier League campaign with a 3–1 victory against Burnley on 18 August at Turf Moor. This match marked the first competitive action for new signings Diego Costa, Cesc Fàbregas and Thibaut Courtois, the latter starting in goal after a three-year loan spell at Atlético Madrid. Didier Drogba also made his return appearance to the Chelsea squad, coming off the bench in the second half.

On 24 January 2015, Chelsea were knocked out of the fourth round of the FA Cup with a surprise 2–4 defeat to League One side Bradford City, ending their hopes of a potential quadruple. Mourinho described the defeat as a "disgrace". On 1 March 2015, Chelsea defeated Tottenham Hotspur 2–0 in the League Cup final to claim their first trophy of the season, and Mourinho's first trophy since returning to Chelsea. On 11 March 2015, Chelsea were knocked out of the UEFA Champions League round of 16 after losing to Paris Saint-Germain on away goals.

On 3 May 2015, Chelsea were crowned Premier League champions after beating Crystal Palace with three games to spare. Mourinho was subsequently named as Premier League Manager of the Season, with Chelsea losing just three matches all season.

2015–16 season
On 7 August 2015, Mourinho signed a new four-year contract with Chelsea that would have kept him at Stamford Bridge until 2019. On 29 August, Mourinho reached his 100th Premier League home match at Chelsea, which ended in a 2–1 loss to Crystal Palace. Chelsea started the season by picking up just 11 points in their first 12 games in the Premier League. They also went out of the League Cup to Stoke City on penalties on 27 October.

On 17 December 2015, after losing 9 of 16 Premier League matches, Chelsea announced that they had parted company with Mourinho "by mutual consent". The club went on to state, "The club wishes to make clear Jose leaves us on good terms and will always remain a much-loved, respected and significant figure at Chelsea."

Manchester United

2016–17 season

On 27 May 2016, Mourinho signed a three-year contract with Manchester United, with an option to stay at the club until at least 2020. On 7 August 2016, Mourinho won his first trophy, the FA Community Shield, beating reigning Premier League champions Leicester City 2–1. Mourinho was victorious in his first Premier League game as United boss, winning 3–1 away to AFC Bournemouth on 14 August 2016.

On 11 September 2016, Mourinho lost his first Manchester derby as a manager in a 2–1 defeat to Manchester City; this was also his eighth loss against his rival manager while with Real Madrid, former Barça manager Pep Guardiola.

On 23 October 2016, Mourinho made his first visit back to Chelsea with Manchester United since leaving in December 2015. The match ended in a 4–0 defeat which left them six points off the top of the table. Mourinho won his second Manchester derby as a manager on 26 October 2016 in a 1–0 victory at Old Trafford in the EFL Cup. Juan Mata scored the only goal of the game in the 54th minute, with the victory being Mourinho's fourth against Guardiola (four wins, six draws, eight losses).

Following the charges made by the FA over Mourinho's comments about referee Anthony Taylor, Mourinho once again got into trouble with a referee on 29 October when he was sent to the stands by Mark Clattenburg during the 0–0 home draw against Burnley. On 29 January 2017, despite a 2–1 second leg loss away to Hull City, Mourinho's United reached the final of the EFL Cup by virtue of a 3–2 aggregate win. Manchester United won 3–2 over Southampton in the EFL Cup Final at Wembley. With the victory, he became the first United manager to win a major trophy in his debut season.

On 24 May 2017, Manchester United won the Europa League courtesy of a 2–0 win over Ajax. This was Mourinho's second major trophy of his first season as Manchester United manager. It also maintained his 100% record of winning every major European Cup final as a manager.

2017–18 season

Mourinho strengthened his side further in the summer of 2017, with the signings of Belgian striker Romelu Lukaku, defender Victor Lindelöf and midfielder Nemanja Matić. United made a strong start to the season before a difficult winter schedule widened the gap between them and city rivals Manchester City.

Mourinho was criticised for Manchester United's Champions League exit to Sevilla at the last-sixteen stage, which resulted in a surprise twelve minute rant from Mourinho defending his United career. Manchester United finished second in the table after a 1–0 home defeat to West Bromwich Albion, finishing nineteen points behind Manchester City. United also lost the 2018 FA Cup Final to Mourinho's former club Chelsea after an Eden Hazard penalty sealed a 1–0 win for the Blues.

2018–19 season
After a poor start to the 2018–19 season which saw Manchester United lose two of their opening three league games for the first time in 26 years, including a 3–0 home loss to Tottenham Hotspur – the heaviest home defeat of his career – an animated Mourinho demanded "respect" from critical journalists and held up three fingers (one for each Premier League trophy he had won as coach), adding: "I won more Premier Leagues alone than the other 19 managers [in the league] together." At his next press conference four days later, he said: "I am the manager of the one of the greatest clubs in the world but I'm also one of the greatest managers in the world."

At the end of a Manchester United league game at Mourinho's former club Chelsea on 20 October 2018, Mourinho was involved in a tunnel incident. With Chelsea's Ross Barkley scoring a 96th-minute equaliser, a Chelsea coach, Marco Ianni, celebrated the goal by running across the Manchester United bench and clenching his fists close to Mourinho's face. An incensed Mourinho leapt up and attempted to chase Ianni down the tunnel, with security intervening. As he sat back down, some Chelsea fans repeatedly (and loudly) started chanting against Mourinho. At full-time, Mourinho walked over to United fans and applauded, and on his way back to the tunnel he held up three fingers towards Chelsea fans, reminding them he won three Premier League titles for the club.

After starting the 2018–19 season with just seven wins in the first 17 Premier League games, leaving Manchester United 19 points behind the league leaders, Mourinho was sacked by the club on 18 December 2018.

Tottenham Hotspur
On 20 November 2019, Mourinho was appointed as the manager of Tottenham Hotspur on a four-year contract, replacing the sacked Mauricio Pochettino.

2019–20 season

On 23 November 2019, Mourinho managed his first match with Tottenham Hotspur in a 3–2 away win against West Ham United. He later sparked media attention on 26 November 2019, when he claimed that ball boy Callum Hynes 'assisted' Spurs' second goal in a 4–2 win over Olympiacos in the Champions League. In the Champions League round of 16, Tottenham Hotspur lost both matches to be defeated 0–4 on aggregate against RB Leipzig.

Mourinho recorded his 300th win in English football when Tottenham beat West Ham United 2–0 on 23 June 2020. He secured his first ever win as a manager at St James' Park on 15 July 2020 when Tottenham defeated Newcastle by a scoreline of 3–1. Mourinho finished his first season with Tottenham Hotspur at sixth position in the Premier League.

2020–21 season
On 4 October 2020, Mourinho managed Tottenham Hotspur to a 6–1 win against his former club Manchester United at Old Trafford. A 2–0 victory over Arsenal on 6 December 2020 put Tottenham on top of the Premier League and meant Mourinho was only the club's second manager to win his first two North London derbies. A last-minute 2–1 defeat to Liverpool at Anfield saw them drop to second place, three points off the top.

On 10 February 2021, Tottenham were knocked out of the FA Cup, losing 5–4 after extra time to Everton in the quarter-finals; this was the first time since 2010 that a José Mourinho-led team had conceded five goals in a match. On 23 February 2021, Tottenham lost 1–0 to Chelsea, marking the first time in his career that Mourinho had lost two consecutive home games. On 18 March, Tottenham lost 3–0 to Dinamo Zagreb after extra time in the second leg of the 2020–21 UEFA Europa League round of 16, being eliminated from the competition 3–2 on aggregate.

On 19 April 2021, Mourinho was sacked by Tottenham Hotspur after 17 months in charge of the club, days before the EFL Cup Final against Manchester City. This marked the first time Mourinho had departed a club without winning a trophy since 2002. He was replaced by former Tottenham Hotspur player Ryan Mason as interim manager.

Roma

On 4 May 2021, Mourinho was appointed head coach of Roma from the start of the 2021–22 season, replacing compatriot Paulo Fonseca.

2021–22 season
On 19 August 2021, Mourinho managed his first match with Roma in a 2–1 away win against Trabzonspor in the first leg of the UEFA Europa Conference League play-off round. Three days later, he made his return to Serie A, after eleven years, managing a 3–1 home victory over Fiorentina at Stadio Olimpico. On 26 August, Mourinho secured qualification for the Europa Conference League, after overseeing a 3–0 home win against Trabzonspor in the play-off second leg. Mourinho reached 1,000 games as a manager in a 2–1 win against Sassuolo on 12 September 2021. On 26 September against Lazio, Roma lost 2–3, Mourinho became the first Roma manager to lose his first Serie A Roma's derby since Luis Enrique in 2011. On 21 October in a Conference League game against FK Bodø/Glimt, Roma suffered a humiliating 1–6 defeat, Mourinho blamed the defeat on 'not having a very good squad', it was the first time that one of Mourinho's sides conceded 6 goals in one match.
Ten days later against Milan, Mourinho suffered his first home defeat in league games in Italy, before this match he was unbeaten in 43 matches in a row.

On 4 December against Inter, Roma was defeated 3–0, it was the first time in Mourinho's career that one of his teams was 3–0 down at half-time, he said after the match that Inter 'are stronger than Roma in normal conditions, in non-normal conditions, they are much stronger'. On 20 March 2022, Mourinho won his first Derby della Capitale after managing a 3–0 win over Lazio.

On 5 May, Mourinho guided Roma to their first European final since 1991 by beating Leicester City 2–1 on aggregate in the semi-finals of the Europa Conference League, making him the first manager to reach the final of all three current major European competitions and the first manager to reach a major European final with four different clubs. On 24 May, Mourinho won his first title with Roma by defeating Feyenoord in the 2022 UEFA Europa Conference League Final.
This was Roma's first trophy in 11 years, making him the third manager – after Udo Lattek and Giovanni Trapattoni – to have won all three existing major European trophies, and the first to achieve the UEFA treble by winning the Champions League, UEFA Cup/Europa League, and Europa Conference League (in place of the defunct UEFA Cup Winners' Cup).

Manager profile

Tactics

Mourinho has been noted for his tactical prowess, game management, and adaptability to different situations. Teams under Mourinho's management typically demonstrate great defensive awareness as well as a quick transition ability with the ball through midfield, in particular down the flanks. A common feature of his teams is playing with three or more central midfielders, as Mourinho has stressed midfield superiority as crucial in winning games. As a Porto manager, Mourinho employed a diamond 4–4–2 formation, with his midfield – consisting of Costinha or Pedro Mendes as defensive midfielder; Maniche and Dmitri Alenichev as wide central midfielders; and Deco on the tip – acting as a cohesive unit rather than a collection of individuals, providing Porto with midfield superiority while allowing the full-backs to move forward.

During his first two years at Chelsea, Mourinho employed a fluid 4–3–3 formation, having Claude Makélélé play the role of deep-lying midfielder. This gave Chelsea a three-against-two midfield advantage over most English teams playing 4–4–2 at the time, and helped Chelsea win Premier League titles in 2004–05 and 2005–06. Mourinho explained:

Look, if I have a triangle in midfield – Claude Makélélé behind and two others just in front – I will always have an advantage against a pure 4–4–2 where the central midfielders are side by side. That's because I will always have an extra man. It starts with Makelele, who is between the lines. If nobody comes to him he can see the whole pitch and has time. If he gets closed down it means one of the two other central midfielders is open. If they are closed down and the other team's wingers come inside to help, it means there is space now for us on the flank, either for our own wingers or for our full-backs. There is nothing a pure 4–4–2 can do to stop things.

Andrei Shevchenko's signing forced Mourinho to switch to a 4–1–3–2 for the 2006–07 season. At Inter, he won his first Serie A title alternating between a 4–3–3 and a diamond, and in his second season, the signings of Samuel Eto'o, Diego Milito, Wesley Sneijder and Goran Pandev, along with that of Thiago Motta, enabled him to play a 4–2–3–1 formation, after initially using a 4–3–1–2 formation with little success in Europe, despite being effective domestically. In this formation, Cameroonian striker Eto'o was used out of position as a left-winger, and the 4–2–3–1 effectively became a pure 4–5–1 without the ball; the tactical switch proved to be effective in European competitions in particular, as Inter went on to win the treble that season.

As Real Madrid manager from 2010 to 2013, Mourinho utilised an even more flexible 4–2–3–1 formation, with Xabi Alonso and Sami Khedira as holding midfielders, Mesut Özil as the attacking midfielder, and Cristiano Ronaldo and Ángel Di María flanking Karim Benzema as the lone striker. This formation allowed for rapid counter-attacks, with the four attackers being able to play any of the four offensive positions. Consequently, Benzema would often drop deep to act as a false 9, thus creating space for Cristiano Ronaldo to make runs off the ball into the centre from the left flank and get on the end of passes. In the 2011–12 season, Madrid won La Liga nine points clear of second-placed Barcelona, breaking many records, including points collected (100) and goals scored (121). In all of Mourinho's three seasons at Madrid, the team consistently reached the semi-finals of the Champions League. The counter-attacking system pioneered by Mourinho continued, with its variations, to be used to further success at Madrid by his successors Carlo Ancelotti and Zinedine Zidane.

Mourinho is praised for his quick reactions to a game's events. In a 2012–13 Champions League round of 16 second leg encounter with Manchester United at Old Trafford, and with Real Madrid losing 1–0 and facing imminent elimination, United's Nani was sent off for a harsh charge on Álvaro Arbeloa. Mourinho quickly introduced Luka Modrić and moved Sami Khedira to the right flank, where Manchester United had a numerical disadvantage due to Nani's red card. This forced United manager Sir Alex Ferguson to move Danny Welbeck from the midfield to that flank, thus freeing Xabi Alonso, and two quick goals turned the game in Madrid's favour. In the second leg of the 2009–10 Champions League semi-final against Barcelona, Motta's controversial sending off led Mourinho to sit deep and narrow in order to defend their lead from the first leg away from home, while Barcelona were allowed to control possession. Mourinho also used his left winger Eto'o as a makeshift left-sided attacking wing-back. Although Inter lost the second leg 1–0, they advanced to the final 3–2 on aggregate; Mourinho later described the match as "the most beautiful defeat of [his] life."

Mourinho is also renowned for always being well-informed about his next opponent and tactically outwitting other managers in games. In a 2004 Champions League knockout stage home game between Porto and Sir Alex Ferguson's Manchester United, Mourinho had already asserted that United's weakness was on the flanks, especially on the left where Quinton Fortune was protected by Ryan Giggs. The central pairing of Maniche and Deco targeted that flank with their threaded passes, and Dmitri Alenichev wreaked havoc. He set up Benny McCarthy's equaliser in the first half, then with United focussed on defending the left, Porto switched to the other side, where McCarthy was able to beat Gary Neville and Wes Brown to score the winner.

Mourinho is also acknowledged for his attention to detail, organisational planning and in-game communication. In a 2013–14 Champions League knockout game against Paris Saint-Germain, when Chelsea needed one goal within 10 minutes to progress, he played a risky 4–1–2–3 in the last quarter, which led to Demba Ba's winning goal. After the game, Mourinho said that his team had worked excessively on three alternative formations in training:

We trained yesterday with the three different systems we used, the one we started with, the one without [Frank] Lampard and finally the one with Demba and Fernando [Torres] in, and the players knew what to do.

When Ba hit the winner, Mourinho darted down the touchline "in celebration", but afterwards he said he was primarily running to tell Torres and Ba their positional instructions for the remaining six minutes of the contest, which is backed up by the pictures. Ba's job was to sit in front of the defence and mark Alex if he ventured forward, Torres' to man-mark Maxwell.

On 16 April 2017, Mourinho's Manchester United beat league leaders Chelsea 2–0. During the game, Mourinho instructed Ander Herrera to man-mark Eden Hazard. This tactic proved effective as Hazard, and Chelsea, were nullified for large portions of the game. A previously untested strike partnership of Marcus Rashford and Jesse Lingard also caused the Chelsea defence problems, with the former opening the scoring in the 7th minute. Mourinho's tactical organisation throughout the match drew praise within the footballing world.

Reception

Since the self proclamation in 2004, Mourinho is often nicknamed "The Special One". He is widely regarded by several players and coaches to be one of the best managers of his generation and one of the greatest ever managers. In 2010, Pep Guardiola described Mourinho as "probably the best coach in the world". Pundit Nicky Bandini praised Mourinho for his ability to motivate his players and a create a united team environment during Inter's 2009–10 treble winning season, noting that throughout the course of the season playmaker Sneijder went as far to say that he would "kill and die" for Mourinho, views which were later also echoed by the club's former striker Ibrahimović, who had worked under Mourinho the previous season, while Dejan Stanković instead said that he "would have thrown [himself] into a fire" for his manager. Eto'o also praised Mourinho for his player management skills during their time at the club together, describing him as a "unique" head coach, who "...perfectly understood every player and the sentiments of the Inter fans. He knew how to combine these two things, he was perfect." Chelsea midfielder Frank Lampard has stated that Mourinho is the best manager he has ever worked for.

A plethora of Mourinho's tactical decisions have been met with criticism. Throughout his career, he has sometimes been accused of playing defensive, dull football to grind out results. In 2011, Morten Olsen concluded that he doesn't "like his persona or the way he plays football negatively". Additionally, Johan Cruyff stated that same year, "Mourinho is a negative coach. He only cares about the result and doesn't care much for good football."

Media attention and controversies

Chelsea

Following a Champions League tie between Chelsea and Barcelona in March 2005, Mourinho accused referee Anders Frisk and Barcelona coach Frank Rijkaard of breaking FIFA rules by having a meeting at half-time. Mourinho said that this biased the referee and caused him to send off Chelsea striker Didier Drogba in the second half. Frisk stated that Rijkaard had tried to speak to him but said that he had sent him away. The situation intensified when Frisk began to receive death threats from angered fans, causing the referee to retire prematurely. UEFA referees chief Volker Roth labelled Mourinho an "enemy of football", although UEFA distanced themselves from the comment. After an investigation of the incident, Mourinho was given a two-match touchline ban for his behaviour and both Chelsea and the manager were fined by UEFA, though the body confirmed that it did not hold Mourinho personally responsible for Frisk's retirement.

On 2 June 2005, Mourinho was fined £200,000 for his part in the meeting with then Arsenal full-back Ashley Cole in January of that year. The pair had met to discuss transfer terms while Cole was still under contract to Arsenal, which was in breach of the Premier League rules. His fine was later reduced to £75,000 after a hearing in August. Later that year, he labelled Arsenal manager Arsène Wenger "a voyeur" after being irked at what he saw as the latter's apparent obsession with Chelsea. Wenger was furious with the remark and considered taking legal action against Mourinho. The animosity died down, and the two managers made peace after Mourinho admitted that he regretted making the comment. In February 2014, Mourinho referred to Wenger as a "specialist in failure".

Inter Milan

Presentation
On 3 June 2008, during the press conference introducing him as new Inter manager, Mourinho spoke almost perfect Italian. When asked about how he would see players like Frank Lampard or Michael Essien in Italian Serie A, Mourinho realised that this was a way of making him speak about Chelsea players, something he had refused to do in previous questions. Consequently, he replied "Ma io non sono pirla!" (Milan dialect for "I'm not stupid!").

Lo Monaco comments
After Inter defeated Catania 2–1 on 13 September 2008, the opponents' CEO Pietro Lo Monaco resented the fact that Mourinho had underlined Inter's superiority in the match, especially by saying that he could have played in goal for Inter. Lo Monaco stated: "Mourinho andrebbe preso a bastonate sui denti" (Italian for "Mourinho should be beaten on his teeth"). Lo Monaco later clarified that he did not mean to encourage violence, but that it was just a way of saying that Mourinho should shut up. When asked about Lo Monaco's statements, Mourinho replied that he did not know him, saying that he only knew other Monacos such as the principality, or Bayern Munich, known in Italy as Bayern Monaco.

Comparison with Mancini
On 9 November 2008, after Inter defeated Udinese 1–0 via a late Julio Ricardo Cruz goal, Mourinho had a discussion with the journalist Mario Sconcerti. As the Portuguese manager had underlined on the day before that he was collecting more points during his first Serie A campaign with Inter compared to Roberto Mancini's first season, basically with the aim of defending his work, which media considered below expectations, Sconcerti invited Mourinho to avoid comparisons with the Italian manager, who could not respond directly. An annoyed Mourinho replied to Sconcerti asking for honest comparisons and emphasising once again that he was doing better than Mancini.

Wild celebration against Siena
On 20 December 2008, after Maicon scored the late winning goal in a difficult away match against Siena, which ended 2–1, Mourinho wildly ran in front of the tiers reserved to Inter supporters to celebrate, hugging the Brazilian himself. In the post-match interview, the journalist Maurizio Pistocchi showed his surprise for Mourinho's behaviour, which he considered exaggerated and possibly a lack of respect to Siena supporters. The Portuguese manager replied that he was used to that, recalling his iconic celebration in Old Trafford in the second leg of the Champions League round of 16 against Manchester United in 2004, when his team eventually won.

Statement about the 2006 Scudetto
During the halftime of a January 2009 match against Atalanta, Mourinho was quoted as saying: "The first Scudetto was given to you in the secretariat [referencing the controversial 2005–06 Serie A title awarded to third-placed Inter in the aftermath of the Calciopoli scandal], the second you won it because there was no one there [to compete against], the third [you won it] at the last minute. You are a shitty team." Although Mourinho justified himself by stating that "[s]ometimes you need to tell lies to stimulate the players, to piss them off", he admitted having said the statement.

Zeru tituli conference
During a press conference on 3 March 2009, Mourinho said that Milan and Roma would end the season with no honours and alleged that Juventus had collected a lot of points thanks to referees' mistakes; he also accused Italian sport journalists of "intellectual prostitution" on their behalf, as they were focusing on a possible mistake regarding a penalty conceded to Inter against Roma instead of talking about the failures of Inter's rivals.

His rant promptly became popular in Italy, especially regarding the "zero titles" quote used by Mourinho, and incorrectly pronounced by him as zeru tituli (in correct Italian it would have been zero titoli), which was later extensively referred to by football journalists in Italy. It also became the title's catchphrase used by fans to celebrate Inter's 17th Scudetto later that season. The catchphrase was even used by Nike to present the celebration shirts for Inter's Serie A title. After the Coppa Italia final in May, fans of Roma's cross-town rivals Lazio, the new Coppa Italia winners, quoted Mourinho's "zeru tituli" statement by waering shirts with Io campione, tu zero titoli ("I'm a champion, you have no honours") on it.

During the same press conference, Mourinho also directly attacked Roma manager Luciano Spalletti and Juventus manager Claudio Ranieri: the former as he was used to continuously releasing interviews, in contrast with Mourinho, who disliked that in spite of the fact that he was considered good at it; the latter as he rejected Mourinho's claims that his team had taken advantage of referees' mistakes. Mourinho said that the single time Inter benefitted was an offside goal against Siena.

Italy national team representatives
Mourinho once again sparked controversy in the summer with his argument with Italy national team coach Marcello Lippi. Lippi predicted that Juventus would win the scudetto in the 2009–10 season, which Mourinho viewed as a disrespectful statement to Inter coming from a national team manager. Lippi responded by saying that it was just a prediction. 

After the row with Lippi, he clashed with Italy captain Fabio Cannavaro over Davide Santon's place in the Inter squad. Cannavaro had said that Santon might have to leave Inter to get regular playing time to gain selection for Italy in the upcoming World Cup. Mourinho responded by saying that Cannavaro was acting like "a coach, a sporting director or a president".

Incident with Ramazzotti
After Inter drew 1–1 with Atalanta on 13 December 2009, Mourinho attacked the Corriere della Sera journalist Andrea Ramazzotti, who was not allowed to stay near Inter bus according to the Portuguese manager. Ramazzotti had obtained the authorization from both Inter and Atalanta press offices to attend players' interviews in that spot. Allegedly, Mourinho not only insulted the journalist but also grabbed him, thus causing controversy. A lot of colleagues sided with Ramazzotti, defending the general right to report news without fearing to be attacked and considering the incident very serious. Subsequently, Inter president Massimo Moratti phoned Ramazzotti in order to apologise to him. Furthermore, the Federal Prosecutor referred Mourinho "for having said, towards the sports journalist Andrea Ramazzotti, offensive remarks as well as for having grabbed his forearms". Inter was also referred for strict liability.

A few days after, Mourinho confronted the journalists in the press conference preceding the Coppa Italia match against Livorno. The Inter manager explained his behaviour and denied he had physically assaulted Ramazzotti, admitting he had said offensive words he was not proud of. In addition, Mourinho admired the solidarity of Ramazzotti's colleagues and said that he was not supposed to apologize in public as the situation had not happened in public, trying to play down the incident itself.

Two draws in a row
After two away draws in a row against Parma (1–1 on 10 February 2010) and Napoli (0–0 on 14 February), Mourinho defended Inter's performances, stating that he was satisfied with collecting two more points on the road to the league title, despite those results not being positive themselves. In particular, the Inter manager used some sharp words regarding Walter Mazzarri and Aurelio De Laurentiis, Napoli's respective manager and president.

Handcuffs gesture
During the Serie A game against Sampdoria on 22 February 2010, which ended in a 0–0 draw, with two Inter players being sent off in the first half, Mourinho was disappointed by Paolo Tagliavento's refereeing. At the end of the first half, the Inter manager made a handcuffs gesture towards a camera which was considered by the Italian Football Federation as violent and critical of the refereeing performance, and caused a three-game ban against Mourinho. Further complaining happened in the second half, when the referee denied Inter a penalty, booking Samuel Eto'o for diving instead, causing Mourinho to laugh ironically as a sign of complaint. All the supporters in San Siro sided with Mourinho with a pañolada, a very unusual form of protest in Italy.

Parames statement
In February 2010, both Juventus manager Claudio Ranieri and Napoli equivalent Walter Mazzarri released some comments critical of Mourinho: the former said that it was too easy to switch from Chelsea under Roman Abramovich to Massimo Moratti at Inter; the latter stated that he had won more than Mourinho in proportion. Despite Moratti's decision to order a press blackout for Inter following controversial refereeing decisions, Mourinho managed to reply to those managers through his spokesman Eladio Parames.

Real Madrid

In a 2010–11 Champions League match at Ajax in November 2010, late in the match when Real Madrid were leading 4–0, two Real Madrid players received late second yellow cards related to time-wasting. The result of this meant they were suspended for the final group match even though Madrid would come first in the group, but would benefit by entering the round of 16 without any accumulated yellow cards. It was suggested after an investigation by UEFA that this was a deliberate ploy under Mourinho's instruction via two players in a substitution. As a result, UEFA charged Mourinho along with the four related players with improper conduct regarding the dismissals. Although Mourinho denied the allegations, he was fined £33,500 and received a one-match Champions League ban.

On 17 August 2011, in the final of the 2011 Supercopa de España, Mourinho was seen gouging the eye of Barcelona's assistant coach Tito Vilanova during a brawl at the end of the game. After the game, Mourinho did not comment on the incident except to claim that he did not know who "Pito" Vilanova was, with "pito" being Spanish slang for penis.

Manchester United
On 23 October 2016, while Mourinho's Manchester United was trailing 4–0 against Chelsea at Stamford Bridge, Chelsea manager Antonio Conte waved up the home crowd, urging them to make more noise to support the team. At the end of the match, Mourinho shook Conte's hand and whispered into his ear, with media reports claiming Mourinho had accused Conte of trying to humiliate United with his actions. Both managers refused to confirm or deny the report, but Conte disputed claims that he was trying to antagonise Mourinho. Chelsea midfielder Pedro supported Conte, claiming Mourinho's reaction was out of context. The two managers continued to trade insults in January 2018, with Conte calling Mourinho "a little man".

Roma

On 26 September 2021, after a loss to Lazio, Mourinho blamed the VAR and the referee for the result. On 24 October, in a goalless draw against Napoli, Mourinho was sent off due to frequent protests against the referee. On 31 October against Milan, the Giallorossi coach was fined €10,000 for his "ironic and disrespectful" conduct towards the match official after the final whistle.

On first of December, Roma lost an away game against Bologna. Angry about the referee's decisions, Mourinho confronted him after the match to discuss the match incidents. After the match, Mourinho gave a quick press statement in which he advised Roma's attacker Nicolò Zaniolo to leave Serie A, hinting on presumed unfair treatment by the referees, Mourinho himself was given a yellow card for frequent protests.

On 5 February 2022, the referee disallowed a final minute goal for Roma against Genoa due to a supposed foul by Tammy Abraham, Mourinho said about the incident "If that is a foul, the game is not the same. You have to change the name of football." On 19 February against Hellas Verona, Mourinho was red-carded again after kicking the ball and making a telephone gesture toward the referee. Mourinho reportedly told the referee "Juventus sent you". He was given a two-match touchline ban by the Italian FA and fined 20,000 Euros following the incident.On 28 February, Mourinho got yet another red card two minutes into the second half during a 2-1 loss to Cremonese, where he was supposedly spoken to and provoked by the fourth official in a disrespectful manner, which resulted in him having the reaction that had him penalised. He said he went to find the official after the game, but he "appears to have forgotten [what he said]" He was given a two-game ban and been fined 10,000 euros for the incident.

Media

Mourinho signed up to cover the 2018 FIFA World Cup as an analyst on RT. In 2019, he began hosting a show on the RT network called On the Touchline with José Mourinho which covered the 2019 UEFA Champions League. In August 2019, Mourinho joined UK broadcaster Sky Sports as a pundit on their Premier League coverage.

In collaboration with DAZN, in 2019 Mourinho appeared in The Making Of series, a 3 part documentary which relives the significant games that helped define football's greatest modern icons. Mourinho was involved in the 2020 Amazon Prime sports docuseries All or Nothing: Tottenham Hotspur (narrated by Tom Hardy) during his spell managing the club.

In October 2022, Mourinho's famous phrase "park the bus" was added to the Oxford English Dictionary. Mourinho had used this phrase to describe Tottenham Hotspur's negative, defensive tactics following a 0–0 draw with his Chelsea side in 2004, stating "they brought the bus and left the bus in front of the goal as we say in my country".

Personal life

Mourinho met his wife Matilde "Tami" Faria, born in Angola, when they were teenagers in Setúbal, Portugal, and the couple married in 1989. Their first child, daughter Matilde, was born in 1996 and they had their first son, José Mário Jr four years later. Mourinho, whilst dedicated to football, describes his family as the centre of his life and has said that the "most important thing is my family and being a good father." He was selected as the New Statesman Man of the Year 2005 and was described as a man devoted to both his family and his work.

Mourinho has also been a part of social initiatives and charity work, helping with a youth project, bringing Israeli and Palestinian children together through football and donating his lucky jacket to Tsunami Relief, earning £22,000 for the charity. Since his appointment in 2014, he acts as a Global Ambassador of the United Nations' World Food Programme.

Widely known for his strong personality, refined dress sense, and quirky comments at press conferences, Mourinho has experienced fame outside of football circles, featuring in European advertisement campaigns for Samsung, American Express, Braun, Jaguar and Adidas, amongst others. An unofficial biography of Mourinho, titled O Vencedor – De Setúbal a Stamford Bridge (The Winner – from Setúbal to Stamford Bridge), was a best seller in Portugal. Mourinho did not authorise the biography and unsuccessfully attempted to prevent the book from being published.

Mourinho was part of an unusual event in May 2007 when he was arrested for preventing animal welfare officials from putting his dog into quarantine. The dog had not been sufficiently inoculated but the situation was resolved after it was returned to Portugal and Mourinho received a police caution.

Mourinho is a Roman Catholic, saying, "I believe totally, clearly. Every day I pray; every day I speak with Him. I don't go to the church every day, not even every week. I go when I feel I need to. And when I'm in Portugal, I always go." In April 2022, he expanded upon his faith and its relationship with his career, proclaiming: "People think football is my life, but no. There are more important things, including the relationship with God. For me, God is love." Apart from his native Portuguese, Mourinho speaks Spanish, Italian, French, Catalan and English to varying degrees of fluency. Mourinho was chosen to voice Pope Francis in a Vatican-approved Portuguese animated film marking the 2017 centenary of the apparition of Our Lady of Fátima.

On 23 March 2009, Mourinho was awarded a doctorate honoris causa degree by the Technical University of Lisbon for his accomplishments in football. In December 2011, he was named "Rockstar of the Year" by the Spanish Rolling Stone magazine.

Managerial statistics

Honours

Manager
Porto
 Primeira Liga: 2002–03, 2003–04
 Taça de Portugal: 2002–03
 Supertaça Cândido de Oliveira: 2003
 UEFA Champions League: 2003–04
 UEFA Cup: 2002–03

Chelsea

 Premier League: 2004–05, 2005–06, 2014–15
 FA Cup: 2006–07
 Football League Cup: 2004–05, 2006–07, 2014–15
 FA Community Shield: 2005
 UEFA Super Cup runner-up: 2013

Inter Milan
 Serie A: 2008–09, 2009–10
 Coppa Italia: 2009–10
 Supercoppa Italiana: 2008
 UEFA Champions League: 2009–10

Real Madrid
 La Liga: 2011–12
 Copa del Rey: 2010–11
 Supercopa de España: 2012

Manchester United
 EFL Cup: 2016–17
 FA Community Shield: 2016
 UEFA Europa League: 2016–17
 FA Cup runner-up: 2017–18
 UEFA Super Cup runner-up: 2017

Roma
 UEFA Europa Conference League: 2021–22

Individual

 Onze d'Or Coach of the Year: 2005
 FIFA World Coach of the Year: 2010
IFFHS World's Best Club Coach: 2004, 2005, 2010, 2012
IFFHS World's Best Coach of the 21st Century 2001–2020
Premier League Manager of the Season: 2004–05, 2005–06, 2014–15
Premier League Manager of the Month: November 2004, January 2005, March 2007, November 2020
Serie A Coach of the Year: 2008–09, 2009–10
Serie A Coach of the Month: August 2022
Panchina d'Oro: 2009–10
Miguel Muñoz Trophy: 2010–11, 2011–12
UEFA Manager of the Year: 2002–03, 2003–04
UEFA Team of the Year: 2003, 2004, 2005, 2010
World Soccer Magazine World Manager of the Year: 2004, 2005, 2010
World Soccer 3rd Greatest Manager of All Time: 2013
 ESPN 9th Greatest Manager of All time: 2013
 France Football 13th Greatest Manager of All time: 2019
European Coach of the Year – Alf Ramsey Award: 2010
BBC Sports Personality of the Year Coach Award: 2005
La Gazzetta dello Sport Man of the Year: 2010
International Sports Press Association Best Manager in the World: 2010
Prémio Prestígio Fernando Soromenho: 2012
Football Extravaganza's League of Legends (2011)
Globe Soccer Awards Best Coach of the Year: 2012
Globe Soccer Awards Best Media Attraction in Football: 2012
Portuguese Coach of the Century: 2015
PFA Portuguese Manager of the Year: 2017
LMA Performances of the Week: 2 December 2017 (Arsenal 1–3 Man.Utd), 7 April 2018 (Man.City 2–3 Man.Utd)

Others
 Grand Officer of the Order of Prince Henry
Doctor Honoris causa – for his accomplishments in football from Lisbon Technical University

Records
Guinness World Records
Former record holder for most points achieved in a Premier League season (95 points)
Youngest manager to reach 100 Champions League games (49 years 12 days)
Most games unbeaten at home in the Premier League (77)
Fewest goals conceded in a Premier League season (15 goals)
Longest football unbeaten home run by a manager (9 years)

Others
Most Champions League titles with different clubs (two)

See also

 List of English football championship winning managers
 List of Inter Milan managers
 "José and his Amazing Technicolor Overcoat"
 Special 1 TV
 José Arrogantio, a character based on Mourinho in comedy series Harry and Paul

Notes

References

External links

 
 
 
 

1963 births
Living people
Sportspeople from Setúbal
Portuguese Roman Catholics
Portuguese footballers
Association football midfielders
Rio Ave F.C. players
C.F. Os Belenenses players
G.D. Sesimbra footballers
Primeira Liga players
FC Barcelona non-playing staff
Portuguese football managers
S.L. Benfica managers
U.D. Leiria managers
FC Porto managers
Chelsea F.C. managers
Inter Milan managers
Real Madrid CF managers
Manchester United F.C. managers
Tottenham Hotspur F.C. managers
A.S. Roma managers
Primeira Liga managers
Premier League managers
Serie A managers
La Liga managers
UEFA Cup winning managers
UEFA Champions League winning managers
UEFA Europa League winning managers
UEFA Europa Conference League winning managers
FA Cup winning managers
Golden Globes (Portugal) winners
Portuguese expatriate football managers
Portuguese expatriate sportspeople in England
Portuguese expatriate sportspeople in Italy
Portuguese expatriate sportspeople in Spain
Expatriate football managers in England
Expatriate football managers in Italy
Expatriate football managers in Spain
Technical University of Lisbon alumni
Ambassadors of supra-national bodies
World Food Programme people
Association football coaches
Sporting CP non-playing staff
FC Porto non-playing staff